James Dickson Phelan   (December 10, 1854 – February 13, 1931) was a professional baseball player who played second baseman in the Major Leagues in 1884–1885 for the Baltimore Monumentals of the Union Association and the Buffalo Bisons and St. Louis Maroons of the National League. He remained active in the minor leagues through 1899.

External links

1854 births
1931 deaths
Major League Baseball second basemen
Baltimore Monumentals players
19th-century baseball players
Buffalo Bisons (NL) players
St. Louis Maroons players
Peoria Reds players
Elmira Colonels players
Memphis Browns players
Cleveland Forest Cities players
Memphis Grays players
Des Moines Prohibitionists players
Sioux City Corn Huskers players
Lincoln Rustlers players
Memphis Giants players
Memphis Fever Germs players
Nashville Tigers players
New Orleans Pelicans (baseball) players
Scranton Indians players
Shenandoah Huns players
Chattanooga Warriors players
Mobile Bluebirds players
Columbus Babies players
Columbus River Snipes players
Dallas Steers players
Montgomery Senators players
Seattle Reds players
Baseball players from Pennsylvania
Memphis Reds players
Seattle Hustlers players